The African Methodist Episcopal Zion Church, or the AME Zion Church (AMEZ) is a historically African-American Christian denomination based in the United States. It was officially formed in 1821 in New York City, but operated for a number of years before then. The African Methodist Episcopal Zion Church adheres to Wesleyan-Arminian theology.

History

The origins of this church can be traced to the John Street Methodist Church of New York City. Following acts of overt discrimination in New York (such as black parishioners being forced to leave worship), many black Christians left to form their own churches. The first church founded by the AME Zion Church was built in 1800 and was named Zion; one of the founders was William Hamilton, a prominent orator and abolitionist. These early black churches still belonged to the Methodist Episcopal Church denomination, although the congregations were independent. During the Great Awakening, the Methodists and Baptists had welcomed free blacks and slaves to their congregations and as preachers.

The fledgling Zion church grew, and soon multiple churches developed from the original congregation. These churches were attended by black congregants, but ministered to by white ordained Methodist ministers. In 1820, six of these churches met to ordain James Varick as an elder, and in 1821 he was made the first General Superintendent of the AME Zion Church. A debate raged within the white-dominated Methodist church over accepting black ministers. This debate ended on July 30, 1822, when James Varick was ordained as the first bishop of the AME Zion church, a newly independent denomination. The total membership in 1866 was about 42,000. Two years later, it claimed 164,000 members, as it sent missionaries to the South after the American Civil War to plant new churches with the newly emancipated freedmen.  The A.M.E. Zion Church had been part of the Abolitionist movement and became known as the 'Freedom Church', because it was associated with the period after emancipation of the slaves.

Black churches were integral in helping build communities and develop leadership among the freedmen in the South. Later they played an increasingly powerful role in the civil rights movement of the mid-20th century.  AMEZ remained smaller than the AME (African Methodist Episcopal Church, a denomination started in Philadelphia in the early 19th century) because some of its ministers lacked the authority to perform marriages, and many of its ministers avoided political roles.  Its finances were weak, and in general its leadership was not as strong as that of the AME. However it was the leader among all Protestant denominations in ordaining women and giving them powerful roles in the church.

An influential leader bishop was James Walker Hood (1831–1918) of North Carolina. He not only created and fostered his network of AMEZ churches in North Carolina, but he also was the grand master for the entire South of the Prince Hall Freemasonry, a secular black fraternal organization that strengthened the political and economic forces inside the black community. Hood Theological Seminary in Salisbury, North Carolina is named in this bishop's honor.

The Wesleyan-Holiness movement in Methodism came to the African Methodist Episcopal Zion Church, with Julia A. J. Foote among others preaching the doctrine of entire sanctification throughout pulpits of the connexion. Foote was the first woman ordained as a deacon within the connexion in 1894 and "in 1899, was ordained—the second female elder in her denomination."

In 1924 Cameron Chesterfield Alleyne became the church's first resident bishop in Africa.

Notes
The AME Zion Church is not to be confused with the similarly named African Methodist Episcopal Church, which was officially formed in 1816 by Richard Allen and Daniel Coker in Philadelphia. The denomination was made up of AME churches in the Philadelphia region, including Delaware and New Jersey. Though the African Methodist Episcopal Zion Church was founded to grant equal rights to African Americans in Methodist Christianity, its church membership is composed of people of all racial backgrounds.

Key features and early structure of AME Zion Church

The newly formed AME Zion Church had a separate meeting place and time apart from the Methodist Episcopal Church. Autonomy was key for the newly formed church.

A general conference is the supreme administrative body of the church (s. 1988). Between meetings of the conference, the church is administered by the Board of Bishops. "The Book of Discipline is the instrument for setting forth the laws, plan, polity, and process by which the AME Zion Church governs itself."

Today the denomination operates Livingstone College in Salisbury, North Carolina, and two junior colleges. In 1906 the religious studies department of Livingstone College was renamed Hood Theological Seminary, in honor of the influential bishop. Hood remained a department of the College until 2001.

On July 1, 2001, the Seminary began operating independently of the College, and in March 2002, the Southern Association of Colleges and Schools (SACS), the College's accrediting agency, acknowledged that the Seminary was a separate institution, sponsored by the A.M.E. Zion Church independently of the College.

The AME Zion missionaries are active in North and South America, Africa, and the Caribbean region (s. 1988). In 1998, the AME Zion Church commissioned the Reverend Dwight B. and BeLinda P. Cannon as the first family missionaries to South Africa in recent memory. These modern-day missionaries served from 1997 through 2004.  Dr. Cannon was Administrative Assistant to the late Bishop Richard K. Thompson, who oversaw the work of South Africa, Zimbabwe, and Swaziland.

The AME Zion Church has performed mission work in the countries of Nigeria, Liberia, Malawi, Mozambique, Angola, Côte d'Ivoire, and Ghana in Africa; England, India, and Jamaica, St. Croix-Virgin Islands, Trinidad, and Tobago in the Caribbean; and others.

The church today
The church grew rapidly with the ordination of black ministers, but was mostly confined to the northern United States until the conclusion of the American Civil War. In the first decade after the war, together with the AME Church, it sent missionaries to the South to aid freedmen. The two African-American denominations gained hundreds of thousands of new members in the South, who responded to their missionaries and organizing efforts. Today, the AME Zion church has more than 1.4 million members, with outreach activities in many areas around the world. Greater Centennial AME Zion Church located in Mount Vernon, New York and Simon Temple AME Zion Church located in Fayetteville, North Carolina, are two of the largest churches in the AME Zion Church with both having more than 3,000 members. Staying true to their name, The Freedom Church, for the first time in the history of the denomination, in 2016 national Christian television network, The Word Network, featured the AME Zion Church for a two-hour special in response to the massive killings of African-Americans which was led by Rev. Daren Jaime, Rev. Edwrin Sutton, Rev. Brian R. Thompson, and Rev. Stephen Pogue. The AME Zion Church continues to preach truth to power. In this generation an individual member is sometimes referred to as being a "Zion Methodist".

The AME Zion church has been in negotiations for many years to merge with the Christian Methodist Episcopal Church into a tentatively named Christian Methodist Episcopal Zion Church with over 2 million members. The plan was originally for unification by 2004. AME Zion church is very similar in doctrine and practice to CME church and the African Methodist Episcopal Church.

Ecumenism
In May 2012, the African Methodist Episcopal Zion Church entered into full communion with the United Methodist Church, African Methodist Episcopal Church, African Union Methodist Protestant Church, Christian Methodist Episcopal Church, and Union American Methodist Episcopal Church, in which these churches agreed to "recognize each other's churches, share sacraments, and affirm their clergy and ministries."

Notable clergy and members

 Bishop John Wesley Alstork
 Bishop George Lincoln Blackwell
 Marie L. Clinton
 John C. Dancy
 Eliza Ann Gardner
 Bishop Mildred Hines
 Bishop James Walker Hood
 Bishop Singleton T. Jones
 Henry Moxley
 Bishop Stephen Gill Spottswood
 Harriet Tubman
 Bishop Alexander Walters

See also

 African Methodist Episcopal Church
 Black church
 
 Christian Methodist Episcopal Church
 Christianity in the United States
 Churches Uniting in Christ
 Methodist Episcopal Church, South
 Methodist Episcopal Church
 Religion of Black Americans
 United Methodist Church
 Wesleyan theology

References

Further reading
 Brown, Canter, Jr., and Larry Eugene Rivers. (2004) For a Great and Grand Purpose: The Beginnings of the AMEZ Church in Florida, 1864–1905
 Heatwole, Charles (May 1986). "A geography of the African Methodist Episcopal Zion Church". Southeastern Geographer 26#1 pp. 1–11. .
 Hoggard, James Clinton (1998). African Methodist Episcopal Zion Church, 1972–1996: A Bicentennial Commemorative History. AME Zion Publishing House.
 Martin, Sandy Dwayne (1999). "For God and Race: The Religious and Political Leadership of AMEZ Bishop James Walker Hood. University of South Carolina Press.
  Reprinted in 2004 by the A.M.E. Zion Historical Society, Charlotte, North Carolina, .
 
 The Doctrines and Discipline of the African Methodist Episcopal Zion Church, with an Appendix; Revised by the General Conference, Atlanta, Georgia July 16–22, 2008. Charlotte, NC: A.M.E. Zion Publishing House, 2008.

External links
 Official website of the A.M.E. Zion Church
 A.M.E. Zion Publishing House
 Christian Education Department | A.M.E. Zion Church
 Women's Home and Overseas Missionary Society
 Connectional Lay Council | A.M.E. Zion Church
 "The Church in the Southern Black Community", Documenting the American South, University of North Carolina, 2004
 Livingstone College
 Hood Theological Seminary
 Clinton Junior College
 Profile of A.M.E. Zion Church, Association of Religion Data Archives

African Methodist Episcopal Zion churches
 
1821 establishments in New York (state)
Historically African-American Christian denominations
History of Methodism in the United States
Members of the National Council of Churches
Members of the World Council of Churches
Methodism in the United States
Methodist denominations established in the 19th century
African
Religious organizations established in 1821

da:African Methodist Episcopal Zion Church